Tuomas Grönman (born 19 September 1991 in Kouvola, Finland) is a Finnish biathlete.

Biathlon results
All results are sourced from the International Biathlon Union.

Winter Olympics

World Championships

References

1991 births
Living people
People from Kouvola
Finnish male biathletes
Biathletes at the 2018 Winter Olympics
Olympic biathletes of Finland
Sportspeople from Kymenlaakso